Myers Flat (formerly Myers) is a census-designated place in Humboldt County, California. The ZIP Code is 95554. The population was 146 at the 2010 census.

Originally called Myers from the Grant Myers Ranch, "Flat" was added to the name to distinguish the place from Meyers in El Dorado County.

The Myers Flat post office opened in 1949.

Myers Flat is located along the California State Route 254, also known as Avenue of the Giants. The US Post Office's ZIP Code is 95554. The community is inside area code 707.

History
Myers Flat was founded by the Myers family in the mid-19th century.  The Myerses were some of the first homesteaders in the area, growing apples, pears, sweet potatoes, and corn. The town initially served as a coach stop for travelers on their way to San Francisco.  The Morrison-Jackson mill was started and remained active for a long time – until the mid-1980s, when the mill closed down. The old mill site and most of its land are now a part of Riverbend Cellars and much of the land is covered in grape vineyards. Much of the town was destroyed in the Christmas flood of 1964. Because of its low elevation and proximity to the Eel River, the town still has problems with flooding. The town lies below the 100-year flood line. Much of the town consists of trailers and cabins, and some people have homes built to withstand floodwaters.

Demographics
The 2010 United States Census reported that Myers Flat had a population of 146. The racial makeup of Myers Flat was 125 (85.6%) White, 0 (0.0%) African American, 6 (4.1%) Native American, 1 (0.7%) Asian, 0 (0.0%) Pacific Islander, 4 (2.7%) from other races, and 10 (6.8%) from two or more races. Hispanic or Latino of any race were 11 persons (7.5%).

The Census reported that 146 people (100% of the population) lived in households, 0 (0%) lived in non-institutionalized group quarters, and 0 (0%) were institutionalized.

There were 80 households, out of which 15 (18.8%) had children under the age of 18 living in them, 13 (16.3%) were opposite-sex married couples living together, 6 (7.5%) had a female householder with no husband present, 9 (11.3%) had a male householder with no wife present.  There were 9 (11.3%) unmarried opposite-sex partnerships, and 0 (0%) same-sex married couples or partnerships. 43 households (53.8%) were made up of individuals, and 7 (8.8%) had someone living alone who was 65 years of age or older. The average household size was 1.83.  There were 28 families (35.0% of all households); the average family size was 2.68.

The population was spread out, with 20 people (13.7%) under the age of 18, 14 people (9.6%) aged 18 to 24, 33 people (22.6%) aged 25 to 44, 64 people (43.8%) aged 45 to 64, and 15 people (10.3%) who were 65 years of age or older.  The median age was 46.7 years. For every 100 females, there were 97.3 males.  For every 100 females age 18 and over, there were 100.0 males.

The homeowner vacancy rate was 9.1%; the rental vacancy rate was 0%.  82 people (56.2% of the population) lived in owner-occupied housing units and 64 people (43.8%) lived in rental housing units.

Facilities
Myers Flat's downtown consists of a general store, the Four Mori Market; a coffee–espresso shop called The Daily Grind; The Trading Post saloon; Drive Through Tree; an antique shop and thrift store, Latz in the Flats; a gift shop called To Dye For Designs that does custom embroidery as well as unique tie-dyed clothing; Riverbend Cellars Winery; the Groves restaurant (now closed); The Myers Inn, a bed and breakfast; and the Knights Restaurant (now closed). There is also a RV park called Giant Redwoods RV, and a laundromat called Myers Flat Laundromat (now closed). Most of the town is served by the Myers Flat Mutual Water System (https://www.myersflath2o.com/) and the town has its own volunteer fire department.

Culture
Because of its location at the southern entrance to Humboldt Redwoods State Park, the town receives much tourism during the summer months, The town has wine tasting and cold beer at the local market–saloon as well as off-sale liquor. Seasonally, other events such as the Redwood Run and various music festivals bring people from all over the world to Myers Flat.  Myers Flat is made up of many families and young people. The local slogan is "Myers Flat is where it's at".

Government

Climate
This region experiences warm (but not hot) and dry summers, with no average monthly temperatures above .  According to the Köppen Climate Classification system, Myers Flat has a warm-summer Mediterranean climate, abbreviated Csb on climate maps.

See also

References

Census-designated places in Humboldt County, California
Census-designated places in California